The first newspaper was published in Austria in 1605. Until 1940 there were 16 newspapers in Vienna, Austria, but six of them were shut down, leaving ten. The number of national daily newspapers in Austria was 35 in 1950. It decreased to 17 in 1965.

The number of daily newspapers in Austria was 17 in 1995 and remained the same between 1996 and 2000. Eight of them were nationwide newspapers and the remaining nine regional dailies.

In the mid-2000s, daily newspapers were very popular in the country with a cumulative readership of 72.7%. In 2009 the number of newspapers was 19 in Austria.

Below is a list of newspapers published in Austria.

In German

 Heute
 Kleine Zeitung
 Kronen Zeitung
 Kurier
 Neue Kärnter Tageszeitung
 Neue Vorarlberger Tageszeitung
 Neues Volksblatt
 Niederösterreichische Nachrichten
 Oberösterreichische Nachrichten
 Österreich
 Die Presse
 Salzburger Nachrichten
 Salzburger Volkszeitung
 Der Standard
 Täglich Alles
 Tiroler Tageszeitung
 U-Express
 Vaterland
 Volksstimme
 Vorarlberger Nachrichten
 Wiener Zeitung
 WirtschaftsBlatt

In English
ViennaTimes
 The Local (web only)
 Voice of Vienna (web only)

See also 
 Media of Austria
 List of magazines in Austria
 List of Media in Austria

References

Austria
Newspapers